Investigation Discovery is a television channel in the United States. 

Investigation Discovery may also refer to:
Investigation Discovery (Canadian TV channel)
Investigation Discovery (European TV channel)
Investigation Discovery (Indian TV channel)
Investigation Discovery (Latin American TV channel)
Investigation Discovery (Swedish TV channel)